Fambong Lho Wildlife Sanctuary (Devanagari: फाम्बोन्ग ल्हो) is a  large wildlife sanctuary in Gangtok district of the state of Sikkim in India. It hosts a few small hamlets inside, namely Dikchu, Pangthang, and Mangan and is managed by State Forest Department.

Geography

At the top of Fambong Lho WLS is Chuli hamlet. No human habitat is there between the log house of Fambong Lho and Chuli trekkers hut. Gangtok is in the eastern side of this place and Khangchendzonga National Park in its west. Some riverine tributaries flowing through this sanctuary discharge in Teesta and Dikchuu river. These riverine tributaries flowing from north enriches its biodiversity. The highest point of this wildlife sanctuary is Tinjure.

Inside this wildlife sanctuary, the primary ecoregions and their corresponding biomes are:
 Terai-Duar savanna and grasslands of the tropical and subtropical grasslands, savannas, and shrublands biome,
 Eastern Himalayan broadleaf forests of the tropical and subtropical moist broadleaf forests biome,
 Himalayan subtropical pine forests of the tropical and subtropical coniferous forests biome,
 Eastern Himalayan subalpine conifer forests of the temperate coniferous forests biome, and
 Eastern Himalayan alpine shrub and meadows of the montane grasslands and shrublands biome.

All of these are typical of the Bhutan - Nepal - India hilly region. Forest types here include sub-alpine rhododendron forest, fir-oak forest and broad-leaved evergreen forest. This place also houses more than 740 species of flowers.

Fauna

Situated at the junction of Palearctic realm and Indomalayan realm, Fambong Lho Wildlife Sanctuary harbours a large variety of mammalian and avian fauna.
Birds at Fambong Lho Wildlife Sanctuary include species like the hill partridge, satyr tragopan, fire-tailed myzornis, bar-throated minla, red-tailed minla, black-eared shrike babbler, scaly laughingthrush, streak-breasted scimitar babbler, rusty-fronted barwing, yellow-browed tit, red-headed bullfinch, crimson-browed finch, chestnut-crowned warbler etc. The endangered rufous-headed hornbill has been sighted here.

Mammals regularly sighted include barking deer, yellow-throated marten, Himalayan brown bear and red panda. Beside these, takin, red fox and musk deer are also present at higher altitudes. Some very commonly seen mammals in this wildlife sanctuary are Himalayan striped squirrel and Royle's pika.

Threats
On 4 February 2017, a major fire broke out at Tinjurey Ridge in the sanctuary. 18 helicopters were sent to douse the fire, which took several days.

References

External links

 http://sikkimforest.gov.in

Wildlife sanctuaries in Sikkim
Gangtok district
Protected areas established in 1984
1984 establishments in Sikkim